Craig Pumphrey (born January 24, 1974) is a martial arts expert and Guinness World Record-holding professional breaker.

Biography

Pumphrey began his martial arts education when he was fourteen years old.

His first "big break" was diving off a shed and body slamming through 10 feet of ice.

His philosophy is a mixture of Jiu-Jitsu, Pankration and a complete breaking system.  He was promoted to Black Belt by Grand Master Townsley in 2000 and has since been promoted to a 7th Degree Coral Belt by Red Belt Dave Sixel.  He was inducted into the USAFPA Pankration Hall of Fame, International Karate and Kickboxing Hall of Fame, and USA Martial Arts Hall of Fame.

Pumphrey is a police officer for the New Albany Indiana Police Department.

With his brother Paul, he presents the television show Human Wrecking Balls.

References

External links

Living people
Participants in American reality television series
American male karateka
American police officers
1974 births